Ling Jing-huan (7 April 1927 – 14 July 2012) was a Taiwanese basketball player. He competed as part of the Republic of China's squad at the 1956 Summer Olympics.

References

External links
 

1927 births
2012 deaths
Taiwanese men's basketball players
Olympic basketball players of Taiwan
Basketball players at the 1956 Summer Olympics
Asian Games medalists in basketball
Basketball players at the 1954 Asian Games
Basketball players at the 1958 Asian Games
Asian Games silver medalists for Chinese Taipei
Medalists at the 1954 Asian Games
Medalists at the 1958 Asian Games
1954 FIBA World Championship players
Republic of China men's national basketball team players